Thaddeus Laddins Betts (February 4, 1789 – April 7, 1840) was the 32nd and 34th Lieutenant Governor of the state of Connecticut from 1832 to 1833 and from 1834 to 1835, and a United States Senator from Connecticut from 1839 to 1840. He had previously served in the Connecticut Senate representing the 12th District and Connecticut House of Representatives from Norwalk, Connecticut.

Biography
Betts was born in Norwalk, Connecticut. He was the son of William Maltby Betts (1759-1832) and Lucretia (Gregory) Betts (1763-1830). He completed preparatory studies, then attended and was graduated from Yale College in 1807. He studied law, and was admitted to the bar in 1810. He began his law practice in Norwalk. He married Antoinette Cannon who was born on April 20, 1789, and died on February 26, 1864.

Career
Betts was a member of the Connecticut House of Representatives in 1815. He was a member of the Connecticut Senate in 1828 as a senator at-large, and was again a member of the state house of representatives in 1830. Betts was then a member of the Connecticut Senate in 1831 representing the 12th District.

In 1832 and 1834, Betts was elected the 32nd and 34th Lieutenant Governor of Connecticut and served two terms, under Governors John Samuel Peters from 1832 to 1833 and under Samuel A. Foot from 1834 to 1835.

Elected as a Whig to the U.S. Senate, Betts served from March 4, 1839 until his death in 1840.

Death
Betts died in Washington, D.C., on April 7, 1840 (age 51 years, 63 days). The funeral took place at the Capitol with the Chaplains to Congress officiating and the President of the United States, Martin Van Buren, attending.  He is interred at Union Cemetery, Norwalk, Connecticut. There is a cenotaph for him at the Congressional Cemetery, Washington, D.C.

See also
List of United States Congress members who died in office (1790–1899)

References

External links

1788 births
1840 deaths
Connecticut lawyers
Connecticut Whigs
19th-century American politicians
Connecticut state senators
Lieutenant Governors of Connecticut
Members of the Connecticut House of Representatives
Politicians from Norwalk, Connecticut
United States senators from Connecticut
Whig Party United States senators
Yale College alumni
Connecticut National Republicans
19th-century American lawyers